Yuri Shmilevich Ayzenshpis (July 15, 1945 in Chelyabinsk, Soviet Union – September 20, 2005 in Moscow, Russia) was a Russian music manager and producer.

He graduated from the Moscow State University of Economics, Statistics, and Informatics (1968).

January 7, 1970 Yuri Ayzenshpis was arrested. As a result of a search, 15,585 rubles was confiscated as well as his flat and 7,675 dollars. He was convicted on 88 charges (infringement of rules on currency transactions). He was released from prison in 1988 after serving 18 years in prison.

Since December 1989, before the death of Viktor Tsoi in 1990, he has been the director and producer of the group Kino.

Beginning in 1991, he produced for the groups Technology, Moralny codex, and Dynamite, and singers Linda, Vlad Stashevsky, Nikita, and Sasha Gradiva. He was the winner of the Russian national music award Ovation for Best Producer in 1992 and 1995). He was also the first producer for Dima Bilan. From 2001 until his death he was the company Media Star's CEO.

Ayzenshpis died September 20, 2005 at about 20:00 from myocardial infarction in the City Clinical Hospital No. 20.

References

External links
 Айзеншпис: человек с «железным стержнем», подробная биография
 Воспоминания Юрия Айзеншписа о Викторе Цое

1945 births
2005 deaths
Businesspeople from Chelyabinsk
Russian people of Jewish descent
Russian record producers
Soviet businesspeople
20th-century Russian businesspeople
Moscow State University of Economics, Statistics, and Informatics alumni